The Oedipodea is a lost poem of the Theban cycle, a part of  the Epic Cycle . The poem was about 6,600 verses long and the authorship was credited by ancient authorities  to Cinaethon, a barely known poet who lived probably in Sparta. Eusebius says that he flourished in 764/3 BC. Only three short fragments and one testimonium survived.

It told the story of the Sphinx and Oedipus and presented an alternative view of the Oedipus myth. According to Pausanias, Cinaethon states that the marriage between Oedipus and his own mother, Jocasta was childless; his children had been born from another engagement with Euryganeia, daughter of Hyperphas. That is all we know about these two characters.

A small glimpse of Cinaethon's style survives in Plutarch's On the Pythia's Oracles 407b: "he added unnecessary pomp and drama to the oracles".

References

Select editions and translations

Critical editions
 .
 .
 .
 .

Translations
 . (The link is to the 1st edition of 1914.) English translation with facing Greek text; now obsolete except for its translations of the ancient quotations.
 . Greek text with facing English translation

Bibliography
 .

8th-century BC books
8th-century BC poems
Theban Cycle
Lost poems